Shelkeh Banan (also Romanized as Shelkeh Bānān; also known as Shakbānān and Shelekbānān) is a village in Gasht Rural District, in the Central District of Fuman County, Gilan Province, Iran. At the 2006 census, its population was 310, in 88 families.

References 

Populated places in Fuman County